Lutwyche busway station is located in Brisbane, Australia serving the suburb of Lutwyche. It opened on 18 June 2012 when the Northern Busway was extended from Windsor to Kedron Brook.

It is served by four routes all operated by Brisbane Transport.

References

External links
[ Lutwyche station] TransLink

Bus stations in Brisbane
Lutwyche, Queensland
Transport infrastructure completed in 2012